Matthew or Matt Welsh may refer to:
 Matt Welsh (born 1976), Australian swimmer
 Matt Welsh (computer scientist), computer scientist and software engineer
 Matthew E. Welsh (1912–1995), 41st governor of Indiana, from 1961 to 1965
 Matthew E. Welsh Bridge on Ohio river, named after the above
 Bust of Matthew E. Welsh, a 1996 public artwork by American artist Daniel Edwards

See also
Matt Welch (born 1968), writer
Matt Walsh (disambiguation)